Pediasia epineurus is a species of moth in the family Crambidae described by Edward Meyrick in 1883. It is found in southern Russia, as well as in Minusinsk, the Altai and Turkestan

References

Moths described in 1883
Crambini
Moths of Asia